Patrick Rafter defeated Mikael Tillström 6–3, 6–4 to win the 1998 Chennai Open singles event. Tillström was the defending champion.

Seeds

Draw

Finals

Section 1

Section 2

External links
 1998 Chennai Open Singles draw

Singles
1998 Gold Flake Open
Maharashtra Open